The Air Force Afterburner was a monster truck sponsored by the United States Air Force that raced on the United States Hot Rod Association circuit. It was driven by Damon Bradshaw.

History 
The Afterburner debuted in 2006 and was equipped with  tires and a  Merlin 540 engine. Paul Cohen was driver during the 2006 season, and became crew chief in subsequent seasons. Damon Bradshaw took over driving duties in 2007. Afterburner won the Monster Jam World Finals X freestyle championship on March 28, 2009. The truck would retire in 2011, Although the Monster Jam-Air Force Sponsorship would remain. References

External links 

Defunct monster trucks
United States Air Force